The Beatrice Prisen was founded in 1983 by Birthe and Paul Beckett. The prize is awarded annually by the Danish Academy, it is currently DKK 50,000. The prize is handed to an author who writes either lyrics or prose, and whose "published books already have a quality, which there is reason to appreciate, and where there is reason to believe, that he or she will develop further."

Winner

References

External links 
 The Beatrice Prize on Litteraturpriser.dk

Danish literary awards
1983 establishments in Denmark